Henry Rose (3 September 1853 – 9 June 1895) was a New Zealand cricketer and golfer.

Life and career
Rose was born in England and attended Repton School and Trinity College, Cambridge, where he won Blues for association football and rugby union. He left England in 1873 and arrived in New Zealand in 1874. He was a businessman who held directorships in several companies in New Zealand.

He played five first-class matches for Otago between 1876 and 1884. He was a batsman with an awkward batting style but an effective defence. Later he was an office bearer of the Otago Cricketers' Association, whose chairman stated after Rose's death that Rose "had done more financially than any other man to help cricket forward in Otago".

He was runner-up in the inaugural New Zealand Amateur golf championship, played in late 1893, losing to James Somerville in the final. He also represented Otago at rugby.

Rose married Grace Martin in Roslyn, Dunedin, in September 1883. They had five children. He died in June 1895, at the age of 41, from a combination of influenza, tuberculosis and meningitis.

See also
 List of Otago representative cricketers

References

External links
 

1853 births
1895 deaths
People educated at Repton School
Alumni of Trinity College, Cambridge
New Zealand cricketers
New Zealand cricket administrators
Otago cricketers
Otago rugby union players
New Zealand male golfers
Amateur golfers
People from Hampstead
Cricketers from Greater London
Deaths from influenza
19th-century deaths from tuberculosis
Tuberculosis deaths in New Zealand
Deaths from meningitis
Neurological disease deaths in New Zealand